Committee on Agriculture or Committee for Agriculture can refer to:

 United States House Committee on Agriculture
 United States Senate Committee on Agriculture, Nutrition and Forestry
 European Parliament Committee on Agriculture and Rural Development
 Special Committee on Agriculture (SCA), an administrative body of the European Union that prepares the work and tasks of the Agriculture and Fisheries
 Canada–United States Consultative Committee on Agriculture
 Canadian House of Commons Standing Committee on Agriculture and Agri-Food
 Committee for Agriculture, Environment and Rural Affairs, Northern Ireland